Ionuț Laurențiu Rădescu (born 20 March 1995) is a Romanian footballer who plays as a midfielder for Liga I club CS Mioveni.

References

External links

1995 births
Living people
Sportspeople from Câmpulung
Romanian footballers
Association football midfielders
Liga I players
Liga II players
Liga III players
CS Mioveni players